Alonso Antonio de San Martín (12 December 1642 – 5 July 1705) was a Roman Catholic prelate who served as Bishop of Cuenca (1681–1705) and Bishop of Oviedo (1675–1681).

Biography
Alonso Antonio de San Martín was born in Madrid, Spain on 12 December 1642.
On 1 October 1675, he was selected by the King of Spain and confirmed by Pope Clement X on 16 December 1675 as Bishop of Oviedo.
In April 1676, he was consecrated bishop by Francisco de Rois y Mendoza, Archbishop of Granada, with Clemente Alvarez López, Bishop of Guadix, and Melchior de Escuda Aybar, Titular Bishop of Utica, serving as co-consecrators. 
On 21 October 1681, he was appointed during the papacy of Pope Innocent XI as Bishop of Cuenca.
He served as Bishop of Cuenca until his death on 5 July 1705.

References

External links and additional sources
 (for Chronology of Bishops) 
 (for Chronology of Bishops) 
 (for Chronology of Bishops) 
 (for Chronology of Bishops) 

17th-century Roman Catholic bishops in Spain
18th-century Roman Catholic bishops in Spain
Bishops appointed by Pope Clement X
Bishops appointed by Pope Innocent XI
1642 births
1705 deaths